The 2015 Big South Conference softball tournament was held at Amanda Littlejohn Stadium in Buies Creek, North Carolina, from May 7 through May 10, 2015. The tournament winner, Longwood, earned the Big South Conference's automatic bid to the 2015 NCAA Division I softball tournament, where they defeated Virginia Tech but were eliminated by Tennessee and Utah.

Format
The Big South has two single elimination games. An 8 vs. 9 play-in game is held as single elimination. The championship is also single elimination. All other games are double elimination.

Tournament

8/9 Elimination Game

Double Elimination Tournament

All times listed are Eastern Daylight Time.

References

Big South Tournament
Big South Conference softball tournament